The 1979–80 Primera División B de Baloncesto was the second tier of the 1979–80 Spanish basketball season.

Regular season

References

External links
Hemeroteca El Mundo Deportivo

Primera División B de Baloncesto
Primera
Second level Spanish basketball league seasons